The Branded Woman is a 1920 American silent drama film released by First National Pictures. It stars Norma Talmadge who also produced the film along with her husband Joseph Schenck through their production company, Norma Talmadge Productions. The film is based on a 1917 Broadway play Branded, by Oliver D. Bailey and was adapted for the screen by Anita Loos and Albert Parker who also directed.

Plot
As described in a film magazine, Ruth Sawyer (Talmadge) is the unhappy victim of a notorious marriage between her parents. Her grandfather Judge Whitlock (Fawcett) disowns his son and makes the wife Dot Belmar (Studdiford) swear never to claim her daughter. The judge adopts Ruth under the name Sawyer and is known to her only as her guardian. Dot is now associated with Velvet Craft (Serrano) who runs a gambling house. Dot decides to hit at the judge through Ruth by breaking her promise and goes to see her at a fashionable boarding school. Dot is recognized as a notorious woman and Ruth is dismissed as an undesirable student. Her mother takes Ruth to the gambling den and initiates her to its loathsome secrets. When the judge returns from Europe, he immediately goes to Ruth and saves her from the degradation of such a life. Later he has the den closed. Ruth is broken up over her branded name. The judge introduces her to Douglas Courtenay (Marmont), a youthful British diplomat. Douglas is recalled to Paris where a valuable post is awarded him. The Judge and Ruth cross over to Europe on the same ship. Following her grandfather's advice, Ruth does not tell Douglas her story. Several years pass, and Ruth and Douglas are happy in Paris with their baby daughter, and Douglas has steadily advanced in his career. Velvet enters Ruth's life, and she gives him money to buy his silence. She slips, however, when she gives Velvet several large pearls from a necklace. The firm where her husband bought it discovers this when he brings the necklace to add two more pearls. The jewelry house puts a detective on Ruth and Velvet's trail. Ruth finally is forced to confess, and Douglas puts the wrong light on her explanation and says his faith in her is destroyed. Ruth returns to her grandfather's house. Several months later Douglas, thoroughly repentant, finds her, and they leave in happiness.

Cast
 Norma Talmadge as Ruth Sawyer
 Percy Marmont as Douglas Courtenay
 Vincent Serrano as Velvet Craft
 George Fawcett as Judge Whitlock
 Grace Studdiford as Dot Belmar (aka Grace Van Studdiford)
 Gaston Glass as William Whitlock
 Jean Armour as Mrs. Bolton
 Edna Murphy as Vivian Bolton
 Henry Carvill as Henry Bolton (credited as H.J. Carvill)
 Charles Lane as Herbert Averill 
 Sidney Herbert as Detective
 Edouard Durand as Jeweler
 Henrietta Floyd as Miss Weir

Preservation status
A print of The Branded Woman is preserved in the Library of Congress collection.

References

External links

 
 

1920 films
1920 drama films
Silent American drama films
American silent feature films
American black-and-white films
American films based on plays
Films directed by Albert Parker
First National Pictures films
Films with screenplays by Anita Loos
Films produced by Joseph M. Schenck
1920s American films